Eddy Baggio (born 23 August 1974) is an Italian football manager and former player who played as a striker.

Early life
Born in Caldogno, Italy, in the province of Vicenza, Veneto, he is the youngest of the eight children of Matilde and Fiorindo Baggio. Eddy is also the younger brother of the legendary Italian footballer Roberto Baggio, who played as a second striker for Italy, but unlike Roberto, Eddy never made his Serie A debut. Like several of his siblings, Eddy was named after a famous athlete, in his case the Belgian cyclist Eddy Merckx, whilst his older brother Roberto was named after two of his father's Italian footballing idols, Roberto Boninsegna and Roberto Bettega. Neither of the brothers are related to the former Italian defensive midfielder Dino Baggio.

Club career
Baggio started his youth and professional career at A.C. Fiorentina in 1991, the club where his older brother Roberto started to shine, and he was eventually promoted to the first team during the 1993–94 season, in Serie B.

He left the club 4 years after Roberto, and joined two different Serie C1 teams within two years: first Palazzolo, and later Prato in 1995. With Palazzolo, he scored on his professional debut, which came on 28 August 1994, in a 1–1 away draw against Bologna, on the opening match-day of the 1994–95 Serie C1 season. Baggio then joined Serie C2 team Giorgione in November 1995, and played there for 3 years, reaching the semi-finals of the Serie C1 promotion play-offs during the 1996–97 season. He then joined A.C. Ancona and Ascoli Calcio 1898, who were competing in Serie C1 at that time, scoring 11 goals in 32 appearances for the former side.

He returned to Ancona in 2000 and made his Serie B debut during the 2000–01 Serie B season. In the following years, he changed club every season: Calcio Catania (Serie C1), Salernitana Calcio 1919 (Serie B), home-town club Vicenza Calcio (Serie B), Catania again (Serie B), Spezia Calcio 1906 (Serie C1), and he finally settled in Pisa. With Salernitana, on 15 December 2002, he scored his 100th professional goal in a 2–2 home draw against Serie B league leaders Triestina from a penalty; his brother Roberto scored his 300th professional goal on the same day (their father's birthday), also from a penalty. In January 2008 he was sold to Serie C2 club Portosummaga, but managed to play only five times. In August 2008 he accepted an offer from Sangiovannese.

In total, he played 86 Serie B games, scoring 18 goals; throughout his career, he scored 130 goals in all competitions, including Serie B, Serie C1 & C2, the Coppa Italia, and the Coppa Italia Serie C, although he never played in Serie A.

International career
Baggio was called up to the Italy Under-17 side three times in 1991, and represented the team on two occasions. He was a member of the Italy team that took part at the 1991 Under-17 World Championship.

Managerial career
From August 2011, he coached one of the Pisa "Allievi" youth formations. From the 2012–13 season, he became a coach for the Fiorentina youth side, coaching Fiorentina's Allievi Lega Pro. During the 2013–14 season, he was promoted to coach the Giovanissimi nazionali.

Honours
Spezia
Coppa Italia Serie C: 2004–05

References

External links

Profile at aic.football.it 
Profile at figc.it 

1974 births
Living people
Sportspeople from the Province of Vicenza
Italian footballers
Italy youth international footballers
A.C. Ancona players
Ascoli Calcio 1898 F.C. players
Catania S.S.D. players
U.S. Salernitana 1919 players
L.R. Vicenza players
Spezia Calcio players
Pisa S.C. players
A.C. Prato players
Serie B players
Serie C players
Association football forwards
Footballers from Veneto